Ethiraalikal is a 1982 Indian Malayalam film, directed by Jeassy and produced by Sainaba Hassan. The film stars Srividya, Jagathy Sreekumar, Sukumaran and Ambika in the lead roles. The film has musical score by A. T. Ummer.

Cast
 
Srividya as Ammini
Jagathy Sreekumar as Tube
Sukumaran as Gopi 
Ambika as Thulasi
Balan K. Nair as Mathai
Janardanan  as Hamsa
M. G. Soman as Antony
Mala Aravindan as Pareed 
Sankaradi as Mammukka
Sukumari as Karthyayani
Nellikode Bhaskaran as Madhavan
P. K. Abraham as Priest
 Baby Vandhana

Soundtrack
The music was composed by A. T. Ummer and the lyrics were written by Chirayinkeezhu Ramakrishnan Nair and Poovachal Khader.

References

External links

view the film
 ETHIRALIKAL Malayalam film

1982 films
1980s Malayalam-language films